Arthur Hill Badenoch (November 13, 1884 – September 15, 1972) was an American football player, coach of football, basketball, and baseball, and college athletics administrator. Badenoch played college football at the University of Chicago. There he played as a tackle under Amos Alonzo Stagg. Badenoch served as the head football coach at Rose Polytechnic Institute—now Rose-Hulman Institute of Technology—in 1906 and at New Mexico College of Agriculture and Mechanic Arts—now New Mexico State University—from 1910 to 1913, compiling a career college football coaching record of 23–7–2. He was also the head basketball coach at New Mexico A&M from 1910 to 1913 and the school's head baseball coach in 1913. Badenoch served at the athletic director at Rose Polytechnic during the 1906–07 academic year. He held the same position the following year (1907–08) at the now-defunct Brigham Young College in Logan, Utah. From 1908 to 1910, Badenoch was the athletic director of the Illinois Athletic Club in Chicago, Illinois.

Badenoch was born on November 13, 1884, in Chicago to Joseph Badenoch and Elizabeth Hill. He was married to Marion Lucille Bean on August 25, 1908.

Head coaching record

Football

References

External links

1884 births
1972 deaths
American football tackles
Basketball coaches from Illinois
Chicago Maroons football players
New Mexico State Aggies athletic directors
New Mexico State Aggies baseball coaches
New Mexico State Aggies football coaches
New Mexico State Aggies men's basketball coaches
Rose–Hulman Fightin' Engineers athletic directors
Rose–Hulman Fightin' Engineers football coaches
Sportspeople from Chicago
Players of American football from Chicago